Dmitri Vladimirovich Vasilyev (born 25 March 1977) is a retired Russian football player. Unable to recover from a string of injuries, he finished his career in 2008 aged 31. He currently works as a U-9 youth coach at DYuSSh Smena-Zenit.

Career
A DYuSSh Smena graduate and a former captain of Rubin, Vasilyev is also a record holder as he is the first defender to score a hat-trick in Russian Premier League. Since retiring, he briefly appeared for amateur side FC Zapad in St. Petersburg football championship, playing three games.

International career
Vasilyev played his only game for the Russia on 28 August 2003 in a friendly against Israel.

References

External links
 
  Profile

1977 births
Living people
Russian footballers
Russia international footballers
FC Shinnik Yaroslavl players
FC Rubin Kazan players
Russian Premier League players
DYuSSh Smena-Zenit alumni
Association football midfielders
FC Lokomotiv Saint Petersburg players